Ireby may refer to:
Ireby, Cumbria, England
Ireby, Lancashire, England

See also
Irby (disambiguation)